Sonyachny Stadium is a football stadium in the city of Kharkiv, Ukraine.

The stadium was built as a training center in 2011 as part of preparation to the Euro 2012.

The stadium has a capacity of almost 5,000 spectators.

In 2012-2017 the stadium was the home ground of Ukrainian First League club FC Helios Kharkiv.

In 2017-2018 the stadium is the reserve home ground of FC Helios Kharkiv and FC Metalist 1925 Kharkiv.

On 21 May 2022 the stadium was severely damaged by a Russian shelling.

References

External links
 Kharkiv opened the Sonyachny Training Center. Euro-2012. September 8, 2011
 Sonyachny Stadium - FC Helios'es reserve stadium

Football venues in Kharkiv Oblast
Sport in Kharkiv
Buildings and structures in Kharkiv
FC Helios Kharkiv
Sports venues in Kharkiv Oblast
Kyivskyi District (Kharkiv)